Shin Rin-ah (born May 14, 2009) is a South Korean actress.

Filmography

Film

Television series

Awards and nominations

References

External links
 Official website at IOK Company 
 

2009 births
Living people
South Korean film actresses
South Korean television actresses
21st-century South Korean actresses
South Korean child actresses